The Poncione di Manió (2,925 m) is a mountain of the Lepontine Alps, located on the border between the Swiss cantons of Valais and Ticino. The mountain separates the Geretal from the Val Bedretto.

References

External links
Poncione di Manió on Hikr

Mountains of the Alps
Mountains of Valais
Mountains of Ticino
Ticino–Valais border
Lepontine Alps
Mountains of Switzerland
Two-thousanders of Switzerland